Mafeking is a village in Mayaro County, Trinidad and Tobago, located on the Ortoire River. Mafeking has historically had problems with water drainage and stagnant water, leading to fears of dengue fever.

References

Villages in Trinidad and Tobago